The Tangerinn is a bar in Tangier, Morocco, a place of nostalgia for fans of beat generation or beatnik poets.  The bar is adjoined to the Hotel El Muniria where author William S. Burroughs wrote his famous novel Naked Lunch in room #9.  Pictures of beat generation poets such as Allen Ginsberg and Jack Kerouac hang on the walls.

References

Beat Generation
Buildings and structures in Tangier
Drinking establishments in Africa
Food and drink companies of Morocco